Dorothy Koomson (born 1971 in London) is a contemporary English novelist, who is of Ghanaian descent. She has been described as "Britain's biggest selling black author of adult fiction".

Biography
Koomson has two degrees in Psychology and Journalism when she graduated from Leeds University (Trinity and All Saints College). She has written for a number of women's magazines and newspapers, as well as having had over a dozen successful novels published in the UK and US. Koomson spent two years living in Sydney and is currently living in Brighton.

Koomson wrote her first novel, the unpublished "There's A Thin Line Between Love And Hate", when she was 13. In 2003 her debut novel, The Cupid Effect, was published. Her second novel, The Chocolate Run, was published in 2004. In 2006, she published her third novel, My Best Friend's Girl. The book was chosen for the Richard and Judy's Summer Reads shortlist and it received a huge sales boost. Koomson's fourth and fifth novels, Marshmallows For Breakfast and Goodnight, Beautiful, were published in 2007 and 2008 respectively. Koomson's sixth novel, The Ice Cream Girls, was published in 2010.
Koomson's seventh novel, The Woman He Loved Before, was released on 3 February 2011.
Her eighth book, The Rose Petal Beach, came out in August 2012 and was released in paperback form in April 2013. Her ninth book, The Flavours of Love, was published in November 2013, after which she took a longer break before writing her tenth book, That Girl From Nowhere, which was published in April 2015. Her novels have been translated into over 30 languages.

During the 2020 Black Lives Matter protests calling for racial justice, Koomson criticised the UK publishing industry as being a “hostile environment for black authors”, stating that those in the industry have gaslighted Black authors and demeaned, demoralised, and discarded them in reality, while portraying an image of support to the public. Her experiences in the publishing industry were also discussed in an article responding to the "Rethinking ‘Diversity’ in Publishing" report.

Later that year, Koomson was recognised as one of the United Kingdom's 100 most influential people of African or African Caribbean heritage when she was included in the 2021 edition of the annual Powerlist.

In 2020 Koomson launched a podcast intended to help 'demystify the book world'.

In popular culture
 The television adaptation of her novel The Ice Cream Girls by Left Bank Pictures was shown on ITV in the UK in 2013 and had nearly 5 million viewers.
 Koomson's work was referenced in Bernardine Evaristo's Booker Prize-winning Girl, Woman, Other.

Bibliography

 The Cupid Effect, 2003
 The Chocolate Run, 2004
 My Best Friend's Girl, 2006
 Marshmallows For Breakfast, 2007
 Goodnight, Beautiful, 2008
 The Ice Cream Girls, 2010
 The Woman He Loved Before, 2011
 The Rose Petal Beach, 2012
 The Flavours of Love, 2013
 That Girl From Nowhere, 2015
 When I Was Invisible, 2015
 The Friend, 2017
 The Beach Wedding (Quick Reads), 2018
 The Brighton Mermaid, 2018
 Tell Me Your Secret, 2019
 All My Lies Are True (Ice Cream Girls 2), 2020

References

External links
 Official website
 Dorothy Koomson at Twitter
 Koomson on the 'Richard and Judy bookclub
 Koomson Interview by novelist Andrea Semple
 Feature on "Trashionista"
 Rykesha Hudson, "Dorothy Koomson: Making Black Women Visible", The Voice, 14 May 2016.

Black British women writers
21st-century English novelists
Writers from London
Living people
1971 births
English people of Ghanaian descent
English women novelists
21st-century English women writers
Alumni of Leeds Trinity University